Inbred means produced by inbreeding.

It may also refer to:

 Inbred, an insult 
 The Inbreds, a rock band
 Inbred (film), a horror film
 Inbred Mountain, an album by Buckethead